Am Hart is an U-Bahn station in Munich on the U2.

References

External links 
 

Munich U-Bahn stations
Railway stations in Germany opened in 1993
Transport infrastructure completed in 1993